For elections in the European Union, Île-de-France is a European Parliament constituency. It consists of the region of Île-de-France.

Since the 2014 European elections, French citizens living abroad (and not registered as electors for the European elections in another member state of the European Union) are also voting in this constituency.

Results

2009

2004

Brackets indicate the number of votes per seat won.

References

External links
 European Election News by European Election Law Association (Eurela)

Former European Parliament constituencies in France
Politics of Île-de-France